Jeff Cavins (born November 8, 1957) is an American Catholic evangelist, author, and biblical scholar. He was a Protestant pastor before his reversion to the Catholic Church. He is the creator of The Great Adventure Bible Study program, and was the founding host of the Television Show "Life on the Rock" on EWTN and was a host of the Morning Air radio program on Relevant Radio. He resides in Minnesota.

Biography

Early life 
Cavins grew up outside of Minneapolis in a Catholic family. In college, he met his fiancée, Emily.  While attending Christ for the Nations Institute, he noticed how many born-again Christians were attracted to the Bible. This contrasted with how he saw his own faith. In his words, he was looking at "'dead' people in the pews next to me, constantly comparing this and the 'on fire' pentecostal worship services." This led him to leave the faith, which he did after having a public fallout with a Catholic bishop.

Evangelical pastor 
While working for a Christian radio station, Cavins pursued a career as a pastor, and after completing a program at The Institute of Ministry in Bradenton, Florida, returned to Minnesota as the first pastor of Open Arms ministry. While there, he developed the first iteration of his Bible Timeline program, which focuses on understanding the narrative books of The Bible, using a color coded timeline to display the supporting books for each element. This later became the basis for his Great Adventure Bible Study program.

Return to Catholicism and Steubenville 
Cavins decided to return to the Catholic Church following twelve years as an evangelical pastor. In 1996 he introduced his Great Adventure Bible Timeline to Franciscan University of Steubenville where he taught Introduction to Scripture. Later that year, Franciscan University professor Dr. Scott Hahn partnered with Cavins to film "Our Father’s Plan," a 13-part series based on the Timeline program, to be broadcast on the EWTN Global Catholic Network. Cavins received his MA in Theology from Franciscan University of Steubenville in 1999.

Evangelization projects

The Great Adventure Bible Study Program 
Cavins developed The Great Adventure Bible Study program, which organizes the Bible into a reading plan structured on the narrative parts of the text.

The Great Adventure Bible Timeline was used, in 2021, as the framework for the popular Bible in a Year Podcast, hosted by Father Mike Schmitz with commentary by Jeff Cavins.  The Bible in a Year Podcast was the number one podcast in America for 17 days in 2021 and for 5 days in 2022.

Television 
Mother Angelica, then president of EWTN, asked Cavins to develop a weekly live program for young people. At this point, the Cavins family moved to Birmingham, AL where EWTN is located, and started "Life on the Rock" which he hosted for six years.

Author 
Cavins has authored a number of books including My Life on the Rock, Walking with God: A Journey Through the Bible, I'm Not Being Fed, the Amazing Grace Series,  Praise God and Thank Him: Biblical Keys to a Joyful Life, and  When You Suffer

Archdiocese of St. Paul and Minneapolis 
In 2014, Cavins was named Director of Evangelization for the Archdiocese of St. Paul and Minneapolis.

In 2008 he began as the Director of the Archbishop Harry J. Flynn Catechetical Institute in St. Paul, MN. So far, the Institute has graduated over six hundred adult students who are now prepared for teaching Catechetics in the home, at parishes, and in parochial schools.

Year of Mercy 
In 2016, Cavins presented a video reflection as part of a multi-part series offering guidance for thousands of viewers as a response to the Extraordinary Jubilee of Mercy declared by Pope Francis.

Detroit Amazing Parish Conference 
In April 2016, Cavins was a featured panelist at the Amazing Parish Conference, speaking to parishes in the Archdiocese of Detroit about ways that parishes can engage their parishioners to become more involved with the church

Awards 
 "Envoy of the Year" for Excellence in Evangelization, 1997
 "Unity Award" for best Catholic television show, 2000
 "Christ Brings Hope Award" from Relevant Radio

See also 
 Mary Healy (theologian)

References 

American biblical scholars
Christian apologists
1957 births
American Roman Catholic religious writers
Franciscan University of Steubenville faculty
Living people
Franciscan University of Steubenville alumni